Chamzinka is the name of several inhabited localities in Russia.

Urban localities
Chamzinka, Chamzinsky District, Republic of Mordovia, a work settlement in Chamzinsky District of the Republic of Mordovia; 

Rural localities
Chamzinka, Atyashevsky District, Republic of Mordovia, a village in Ushakovsky Selsoviet of Atyashevsky District in the Republic of Mordovia; 
Chamzinka, Ulyanovsk Oblast, a selo in Korzhevsky Rural Okrug of Inzensky District in Ulyanovsk Oblast